This page describes the qualification procedure for EuroBasket Women 2019.

Qualifying draw
The draw for the qualification took place on 4 July 2017 in Munich, Germany.

 Teams marked in bold have qualified for EuroBasket Women 2019.

Groups
The top team from each one of the eight groups, as well as the six best-finishing second-placed teams, will be qualified.

Group A

Group B

Group C

Group D

Group E

Group F

Group G

Group H

Ranking of second-placed teams
The six best second-placed teams from the groups qualified for the final tournament.

References

External links
Women's EuroBasket 2019 Qualifiers

EuroBasket Women qualification
EuroBasket Women 2019
2017–18 in European women's basketball
2018–19 in European women's basketball